Ithaca Public Schools serves as the K-12 education district for the communities of Ithaca, Sumner, North Star and the surrounding townships in Michigan, United States. Most of the district is located in the center of Gratiot County, Michigan. There are three schools within the district. All three schools receive accreditation from North Central Accreditation. The superintendent of schools is Steven Netzley.

All three schools offer extracurricular activities in the forms of athletics, art, and education. Their nickname is the Yellow Jackets.

Buildings

The school is made up of six buildings.

The Junior/Senior High School building serves as both a high school and a middle school. Jim Thompson is the high school principal, and Terry Hessbrook is the assistant principal and athletics director. North Elementary School, located at the north end of Ithaca, includes the grades of fourth to sixth grade. The principal is Brad Palmer. South Elementary School, located at the south end of the community of Ithaca, includes students from kindergarten to third grade. The principal is David Kanine. 

Other school facilities are the ICE building, the FFA Building, and a maintenance/transportation building.

External links
Ithaca Public Schools Website
South Elementary Website
North Elementary Website
Ithaca Jr./Sr. High School Website

Education in Gratiot County, Michigan
School districts in Michigan